Bezirk Bruck an der Mur is a former district of the state of Styria in Austria. Bruck an der Mur merged with the district of Mürzzuschlag to form the new district Bruck-Mürzzuschlag on January 1, 2013.

Municipalities
 Aflenz Kurort
 Aflenz Land
 Döllach, Dörflach, Graßnitz, Jauring, Tutschach
 Breitenau am Hochlantsch
 Sankt Erhard, Sankt Jakob-Breitenau
 Bruck an der Mur
 Berndorf, Kaltbach, Pischk, Pischkberg, Übelstein, Wiener Vorstadt
 Etmißl 
 Lonschitz, Oisching
 Frauenberg
 Graschnitzgraben
Gußwerk
 Aschbach, Gollrad, Greith, Wegscheid, Weichselboden
 Halltal
 Freingraben, Mooshuben, Rechengraben, Schöneben, Walstern
 Kapfenberg
 Arndorf, Deuchendorf, Diemlach, Einöd, Emberg bei Bruck an der Mur, Emberg bei Kapfenberg, Floning, Hafendorf, Krottendorf, Pötschach,  Sankt Martin, Schörgendorf, Stegg, Winkl
 Mariazell
 Rasing
Oberaich
 Heuberg, Kotzgraben, Mötschlach, Oberdorf, Picheldorf, Sankt Dionysen, Urgental, Utschtal
Parschlug
Göritz, Pogier
 Pernegg an der Mur
 Gabraun, Kirchdorf, Mautstatt, Mixnitz, Pernegg, Roßgraben, Traföß, Zlatten
 Sankt Ilgen
 Sankt Katharein an der Laming
 Hüttengraben, Oberdorf, Obertal, Rastal, Untertal
 Sankt Lorenzen im Mürztal
 Alt-Hadersdorf, Fuscht, Gassing, Lesing, Mödersdorf,  Mürzgraben, Nechelheim, Pogusch, Scheuchenegg
 Sankt Marein im Mürztal
 Graschnitz, Schaldorf, Sonnleiten-Wieden
 Sankt Sebastian
 Grünau, Thörl, Fölz, Hinterberg (Gemeinde Thörl), Palbersdorf
Thörl
 Fölz, Hinterberg, Palbersdorf
 Tragöß
 Oberort, Pichl-Großdorf, Tal, Unterort
Turnau
 Au bei Turnau, Göriach, Seewiesen, Stübming, Thal

References

Districts of Styria